Robert Brock may refer to:
 Robert L. Brock (1924–1998), American businessman best known for founding ShowBiz Pizza Place
 Robert K. Brock (1878–1962), American politician in the Virginia Senate